The Madison Blues was a semi-professional minor league baseball team in Madison, Wisconsin from 1923 to 1942. Launched by the Madison Athletic Association and captained by manager Eddie Lenahan, the Blues began independent of any league. They played their home games at Kipp Field for their first three years before moving to the newly built Breese Stevens Field in 1926. They joined the Wisconsin-Illinois league in that year, and went on to play in the Wisconsin State League, the Tri-State League and Three-I League in later years. The Blues final season was in 1942, when the demands for men to serve in World War II ended many other minor league franchises throughout the country.

Notable alumni

 Dave Koslo (1940) 1949 NL ERA Title

 Johnny Schmitz (1940) 2 x MLB All-Star

References

External links
Baseball Reference

Defunct minor league baseball teams
Baseball teams established in 1923
Baseball teams disestablished in 1942
Illinois-Indiana-Iowa League teams
Professional baseball teams in Wisconsin
Sports in Madison, Wisconsin
Chicago Cubs minor league affiliates
1923 establishments in Wisconsin
1942 disestablishments in Wisconsin
Defunct baseball teams in Wisconsin
Defunct Tri-State League teams
Wisconsin State League teams